Yaramushi (also Romanized as Yārāmūshī; also known as Yaramiri (Persian: ياراميري), also Romanized as Yārāmīrī) is a village in Itivand-e Shomali Rural District, Kakavand District, Delfan County, Lorestan Province, Iran. At the 2006 census, its population was 74, in 11 families.

References 

Towns and villages in Delfan County